Johan Alm (1728–1810) was a Finnish painter and field sergeant.

Alm was born and lived and worked most of his life in the city of Vaasa. Alm's son Immanuel Alm was also a painter. They both worked on religious-themed paintings, including altarpieces such as one at the church in Kaustinen. Alm was also responsible for ceilings and other interior works at churches in Kvevlax and Isokyrö.

Further reading

References

 Some of this material was translated from the 
  Appelgren, Kari: Johan Alm, Hantverksmålare i Vasa på 1700-talet, 1974

1728 births
1810 deaths
Finnish male painters
18th-century Finnish painters
18th-century male artists
19th-century Finnish painters
19th-century Finnish male artists